Home is the second album from The X Factor UK series 2 finalists Journey South. It was released in 2007 (see 2007 in music).

The album charted at number 42 on the UK albums chart with sales of 5,120.

Track listing
 "Gone One Day" - 3:35
 "Do You Think Of Me" - 3:27
 "What I Love About Home" - 3:19
 "End Of The World" - 4:10
 "Reconcile Our Love" - 3:49
 "Save Me" - 3:44
 "I Stand Corrected" - 3:34
 "How Do You Mend A Broken Heart" - 3:50
 "In Your Eyes" - 3:31
 "(It's OK) To Be In Love" - 3:47
 "Lonely Nights" - 3:39
 "I'll Be Your Desire" - 2:57

Journey South albums
2007 albums